Pelle may refer to:

 Pelle (album), a 2000 studio album of the Italian band Punkreas
 Pelle (given name)
 Pelle (surname)
 Pelle Pelle, a fashion brand
 An enzyme, also known as IRAK1
 A familiar form of the male given name Per
 Another name of Pella (Thessaly), an ancient town
 Dead (musician) (1969-1991), nicknamed Pelle, Swedish musician

See also
Pell (disambiguation)